A list of horror films released in 1995.

References

Sources

 
 

Lists of horror films by year
1995-related lists